The Liffey Swim, currently titled the Jones Engineering Dublin City Liffey Swim, is an annual race in Dublin's main river, the Liffey, and is one of Ireland's most famous traditional sporting events. The race is managed by a voluntary not-for-profit organisation, Leinster Open Sea. The 100th Liffey Swim over a  2.2 km course took place on Saturday 3 August 2019, starting at the Rory O’More Bridge (Watling Street Bridge) beside the Guinness Brewery and finishing at North Wall Quay in front of the Customs House.

The race is one of the last swims in a season of 30 open sea races held during the summer months, organised by Leinster Open Sea, and takes place usually on a Saturday in either late August or early September. Entrants to the Liffey Swim must complete six qualifying open sea races from the annual Leinster Open Sea Calendar (up from four pre-2015). Many levels and ages of swimmers compete in the race, but entrants must be a member of a swimming club. International competitors are common.  The race is handicapped with the slowest swimmers starting first and the fastest last. For five years between 1934 and 1938, the Liffey Swim was run as a scratch race. In 2020 the Liffey Swim was not held because of the Covid-19 pandemic. For the first time in its 102-year history, the 101st Liffey Swim in 2021 was swum upstream from the 3 Arena to the Custom House over an approx 1-mile course and took place on 23 October, the latest date ever, with the easing of Covid restrictions. Moreover swimmers could elect to wear wetsuits or swimming togs and did not have to swim qualifying races to enter. Winners were declared in both the wetsuit and swimming togs categories, but the official winners of the annual trophies were those in swimming togs category. The winners in the wetsuit category were Aidan Fennin (St Fiach's SC) in a time of 25:48 and Bettina Korn (Eastern Bay SC) in 27:51. The fastest male swimmer in a wetsuit was Aidan Mullaney (Swim Ireland SC) in a time of 18:39. The fastest female swimmer in a wetsuit was Raphaelle Di Feliciantonio (Templeogue SC) in 21:10. The 102nd Liffey Swim was held on 24 September, 2022 over its conventional course; 174 Women and 227 men completed the course.

Course
The race starts at Rory O'More Bridge near the Guinness Brewery and takes competitors past landmarks such as the Four Courts. The competitors swim under James Joyce Bridge, Mellows Bridge, Father Mathew Bridge, O'Donovan Rossa Bridge, Grattan Bridge, Millennium Bridge, Liffey Bridge, O'Connell Bridge, Rosie Hackett Bridge, Butt Bridge and Loopline Bridge near The Custom House.  Average entry is 200 males and 80 females. Wetsuits are not allowed.  The race is held in the tidal section of the river meaning it is flushed twice daily. Due to the tidal nature of the Liffey, race times vary from year to year.

For four years 1936–39, the Liffey Swim took place from Bull Wall to Dollymount Strand (in 1939 to Clontarf Baths) because of the degree of pollution of the course stretch of the River Liffey. For the three years 1977–79, again because of the risks to health caused by pollution, the race was moved to an upstream stretch of the river near Chapelizod, finishing at the slipway of Dublin University Boat House, at Memorial Park, Islandbridge.

Due to the development of the LUAS Bridge, the Rosie Hackett Bridge, from Hawkins Street to Malborough Street, the race diverged from the historic route in 2012 and 2013 starting at the Loopline Bridge beside Butt Bridge and finishing at the pontoon on the North side of the river beside the East Link Bridge in front of the 3Arena. At approx. 1,600 metres it was somewhat shorter than the more spectator friendly route down the Liffey and under its numerous bridges.

History
The first Liffey Swim took place on the 22 July 1920.  Bernard Fagan was the first to organise the race.  Fagan was a swimmer and became the city analyst for Dublin Corporation in 1923. The race was swum at high tide when there were fewer pollutants. The first Liffey Swim had an entry of 28 male swimmers and was won by J.J Kennedy with Bernard Fagan himself coming in third. Fagan's son Jack Fagan later won the Liffey Swim in 1951. During the 1930s, 40s and early 50s the Liffey Swim attracted large crowds.  The race has not changed length from being a distance of one and half miles (2.2 km) but the start and finish points have changed. The race originally started at Victoria Quay, from a Guinness Barge and finished at Burgh Quay.  In 1991 the first ladies race was introduced and in the early 1990s the race was moved 400 yards down river to start beside the Civic Offices and to finish opposite the Custom House.

The 2009 Liffey Swim was the 90th edition of the race and saw electronic timing used for the first time.

One of the earliest Liffey Swims was portrayed in the Jack B. Yeats 1923 painting entitled The Liffey Swim, which won him the Silver Medal for Painting at the Art competitions at the 1924 Summer Olympics. The painting and the Olympic medal can now be viewed in the National Gallery of Ireland. The 100th Liffey Swim was held in 2019. The 2020 Liffey Swim was to have marked the 100th anniversary of the inaugural race but was cancelled due to the Covid-19 pandemic.

Women and the Liffey Swim
An annual Ladies race on the Quays course under the Liffey bridges was not introduced until 1991 and has been held since then as a separate race as part of the Liffey Swim programme. However, efforts to allow participation of women date back to the early years of the Liffey Swim. In 1922 a letter was published in the Irish Independent suggesting that interest in the race would be considerably increased if ladies were permitted to compete. Women already swam in races on the River Lagan in Belfast and on the River Thames in London. The correspondent argued that there was no specific rule against female participation.  A spokesperson for Leinster I.A.S.A. responded informally that “such a contest was not possible, as very few of our ladies were fit for the ordeal”.

The views of the Most Reverend John Charles McQuaid, Catholic Archbishop of Dublin and Primate of Ireland from December 1940 to February 1972, on women competing in sport, in particular at the same sports meetings as men, would inhibit the possibility of a women's race for many years. In 1934 the National Athletic and Cycling Association of Ireland (N.A.C.A.I.) passed a motion at its annual Congress in favour of women competing at its athletics meetings. This unleashed protests against the Association.  McQuaid cited the Acta Apostolicae Sedis, Vol xxii, no. 2, pp 72–75, the Latin text of which was printed in the newspapers alongside his translation of Pope Pius X's encyclical that “the Christian modesty of girls must be, in a special way, safeguarded, for it is supremely unbecoming that they should flaunt themselves and display themselves before the eyes of all’. Thus, the idea of women swimming through the centre of Dublin in full public gaze, even in a separate Ladies Liffey Swim, a display which might undermine the moral thoughts of male onlookers, was unlikely to occur during McQuaid's lifetime.  He died on 7 April 1973.

The first Liffey Swims for women were held in 1977 through 1979, when the race was moved to Islandbridge, because the city stretch of the river was so polluted by its tributary, the River Camac, from Heuston Station, Kingsbridge, to the estuary. The Chief Medical Officer of the Eastern Health Board, Dr Barry O’Donnell, advised that swimming in the traditional stretch of the River Liffey should not take place for health and safety reasons. In consequence the President of the Leinster Branch of the I.A.S.A. announced in June 1977 that the Liffey Swim would not take place until the river water met safe quality standards. To maintain the Liffey Swim, races at Islandbridge were organised by Dublin and Half Moon Swimming Clubs. In 1977 a Liffey Swim for Ladies over 500 yards (handicapped) was inaugurated, the winner receiving the Tommy May trophy donated by the 1956 Liffey Swim winner. In 1980 the Liffey Swim reverted to a men-only event on its return to the Quays. However, what now became the “Upper Liffey Swim” for women on the Islandbridge Memorial Park stretch of the River Liffey continued from 1981 through 1990. To show that women were just as able as men in swimming distances, the race was increased from about 500―600 metres to 1000 yards in 1987 and to one mile from 1988 through 1990. This was the same distance swum by men from 1977 through 1979 on this part of the river. This probably convinced the Leinster Branch of the I.A.S.A. that women could complete the classic course of the Liffey Swim and led to a Women’ race over the same walled Quays course as the men in 1991.

Trophies
The cup presented to the winner of the women's Liffey Swim race is called the Ladies Challenge Cup. It was presented to the Leinster Branch of the Irish Amateur Swimming Association by The Electricity Supply Board in 1991. The inscription on the front of the Cup on a shield bounded on each side by laurel leaves is "Ladies Challenge Cup for Annual Liffey Swim Presented by Electricity Supply Board". The names of all winners since 1991 are inscribed on the base. The trophy was made by Alwright and Marshall, Silversmiths, Dublin (Maker mark A&M in shamrock) and bears the Dublin Assay Office hallmarks and date letter for 1982 (Britannia, Harp with Crown, Letter R).

Between 1977 and 1979, when the women's Liffey Swim was staged at the Islandbridge Memorial Park stretch of the river, a trophy provided by Tommy May, winner of the Liffey Swim in 1956, designated The Tommy May Cup, was presented to the winner of the race. This race continued throughout the 1980s, referred to as the "Upper Liffey Swim". In 1987 the race distance was increased to 1,000 yards and in 1988 through 1990 to 1 mile.

The Cup presented to the winner of the men's Liffey Swim race is called the Irish Independent Cup. It was presented to the Leinster Branch of the Irish Amateur Swimming Association by Independent Newspapers Ltd in 1921. The exact inscription on the front of the cup is "Challenge Cup for Annual Liffey Race (Inaugurated 1920) Presented to the Leinster Branch Irish Amateur Swimming Association by the Irish Independent". The trophy was made by Hopkins & Hopkins, Silversmiths (Markers mark: H&H), located near O'Connell Street Bridge, Dublin, at a cost of 50 guineas [£52-10-0]. The Cup bears the Dublin Assay Office hallmarks and date letter for 1921 (Britannia, Harp with Crown, Letter F). The names of all winners from 1920 J.J. Kennedy through 2004 Robert Clarke are engraved on the Cup. The winners from 2005 onwards are on its base. Although the cup was not presented until 1921, the winner that year, John Cyril Hopkins, insisted that the name of the winner of the inaugural Liffey Swim in 1920 J.J. Kennedy be placed on the trophy before his.

Health issues
Dublin Fire Brigade provide decontamination showers at the finish. There have been concerns about the possibility of contracting Weil's disease in the Liffey as well as other safety concerns relating to pollution. Studies have found that E. coli levels in the Liffey are higher than EPA standard levels.

Liffey Swim - Facts and Trivia
The winner of the Liffey Swim in 1920, J.J. “Jack” Kennedy, was the grandson of Alderman John O’Connor, Lord Mayor of Dublin in 1885.
Liffey Swim with the smallest number of starters/finishers - 20th edition in 1939 - 15 started/12 finished - held over 1¾-mile (2.8 km) course from Bull Wall to Clontarf Baths
Liffey Swim with the highest number of men finishing - 100th edition in 2019 - 364 finishers
Liffey Swim with the highest number of women finishing - 100th edition in 2019 - 252 finishers
First double winner of the Liffey Swim on the classic course in the River Liffey - Francis "Chalkey" White (Guinness SC) on 10 August 1966 and 14 August 1967
Youngest ever male winner of the Liffey Swim - Francis "Chalkey" White (Guinness SC) in 1966 at age 11
Youngest ever female winner of the Liffey Swim - Mairéad Doran (Dublin SC) on 11 September 1979 at age 10 on Islandbridge course
Oldest male swimmer to place in the top three finishers - Jackie Kearney (Dublin SC), 2nd in 2004, aged 73
First time the Liffey Swim was swum on a Saturday - 57th Liffey Swim on 14 August 1976
First time the Liffey Swim was swum in the afternoon - 57th Liffey Swim at 15.00 hrs
Brothers who have won the Liffey Swim - William F. "Billy" Case (1930) and Richard N. "Ritchie" Case (1934, 1936, 1937, 1938) - Clontarf SC; Cyril Hardy (1957) and Anthony "Tony" Hardy (1960) - Crusade Aquatic Club; Colm O'Brien (1963) - Half Moon SC and Bert O'Brien (1988,1995) - Sandycove SC; Fintan O'Meara (1972) and Nicholas O'Meara (1977) - Clontarf SC; Greg O'Dwyer (1986) and Brian O'Dwyer (2010) - Guinness SC; Pat O'Driscoll (2009) - Templeogue SC and Ciarán O'Driscoll (2013) - Half Moon SC Michael Mongey St. Vincents WPC 1997 and Brian Mongey Millennium SC 2000
In 1980 three brothers finished in the top ten finishers - Michael O'Meara (4th), Nicholas O'Meara (6th) and Vinny O'Meara (9th), all members of Clontarf SC
First winner of Liffey Swim from Cork - Andrew Crosbie (Sunday's Well SC, Cork) in 1935, under scratch conditions
First Winner of the Liffey Swim from Limerick - Joe Grant (Shannon SC) in 1950
First Winner of the Liffey Swim from Galway - Patrick "Pat" Broderick (Galway SC) in 1955
Lowest men's winning team score - 1941 North Dublin WSC (1,2,3,4) 10pts - T. Hannigan, S. Thomas, J. Fagan and J. Colgan 
In 1967 William F. Case, winner in 1930, now Detective Garda Case, was awarded the Walter Scott Medal for Valor for rescuing a man and a boy at Barley Cove, West Cork against a strong current, an act of exceptional bravery and heroism involving risk to his own life.
Liffey Swim-Winner Olympians - Thomas "Hayes" Dockrell (1922), 1928 Amsterdam - Water Polo; Charles "Cecil" Fagan (1923), 1924 Paris - Water Polo; David Cummins (1975), 1980 Moscow - 100 m Butterfly, 200 m Butterfly, 200 m Backstroke. 
Liffey Swim-Fastest Swimmer Olympians - Donnacha O'Dea (1963, 1965), 1968 Mexico City - 100 m Freestyle, 100 m Butterfly, 200 m Individual Medley; David Cummins (1976, 1977, 1978), 1980 Moscow - 100 m Butterfly, 200 m Butterfly, 200 m Backstroke; Kevin Williamson (2000), 1976 Montreal - 200 m Freestyle, 400 m Freestyle, 1500 m Freestyle, 1980 Moscow - 200 m Freestyle, 400 m Freestyle
John Cyril Hopkins, Winner of the 2nd Liffey Swim in 1921, became a Sergeant Pilot 17th Fighter Squadron R.A.F.; he was killed on 4 December 1933 as a result of a mid-air-collision flying accident between two Bristol Bulldog aircraft at Milton Lilbourne, Wiltshire, England
Gerry Boland, Liffey Swim winner in 1953, collapsed and died on 3 July 1977, after rescuing his North Dublin SC friend and veteran of 26 Liffey Swims, Jim Kavanagh, from the sea of Clontarf where he had suffered a heart attack during the Leddy Cup 800m open sea race and also died
The Liffey Swim in 1978, held at Islandbridge, is unique in the annals of race in that the first three places in each of the men's and women's races were from the same swimming club - Men: Half Moon SC - 1st Jim Mooney, 2nd Dermot Hughes, 3rd Briam McLoughlin; Women: Guinness SC - 1st Yvonne Smith, 2nd Adrienne O'Rourke, 3rd Joyce Palmer
Highest number of Liffey Swim wins by a man - 4 - Richard N. "Ritchie" Case (1934,1936,1937,1938), all under scratch conditions
Highest number of Liffey Swim wins by a woman - as at 2019 no woman has won the race twice
Highest number of members of one family to complete the Liffey Swim together - 95th Liffey swim in 2014 - Brian Murphy (at "Go", 184th, 55:07) and his four sons, Aidan Murphy (at 8 min, 15th, 36:48). Stephen Murphy (at 6 min 45 sec, 46th, 40:07), Colm Murphy (at 2 min 45 sec, 125th, 47:55) and Martin Murphy (at 2 min 30 sec, 186th, 52:04), all members of Sandycove SC
Double winners of the Liffey Swim under handicap - Francis "Chalkey" White (1966, 1967), Arthur "Art" Dunne (1981, 1982), Bert O'Brien (1988,1995)
Entry Fee for the 1st Liffey Swim in 1920 - 2/6 (2 shillings and 6 pence) (€0.16)
Entry Fee for the 50th Liffey Swim in 1969 - still 2/6 (2 shillings and 6 pence) - in terms of the relative wage of a working man 1920 versus 1969 about 7½ pence (€0.04)
Entry Fee for the 70th Liffey Swim in 1989 was IR£2 (€2.54)
Youngest Male Swimmer to place in top 3 - Ciarán O'Driscoll (Dublin SC) aged 10 – 2nd by 2 yards in the 56th Liffey Swim in 1975
Longest gap between being Runner-up in and Winner of the Liffey Swim - 38 years - Ciarán O'Driscoll (runner-up 1975, winner 2013)
In 1981 two Brothers, Arthur "Art" Dunne (15-years-old) and Gerry Dunne (23-years-old), fought out a stroke-for-stroke duel over the final yards of the Liffey Swim to the finishing boom; Art Dunne was adjudged the winner by a touch
Most Liffey Swims swum by a male competitor - Jackie Kearney (Dublin SC) and Paul Emmett (Half Moon) - exact numbers differ in various sources
Most Liffey Swims swum by a female competitor - Sandra Trappe (Dublin SC) - all the women's races from 1991-2018 except 2007 - Winner in 2003
Longest run of winners from same club - 6 - Half Moon SC (1978-1983) - Jimmy Mooney, Dermot Hughes, Michael Fitzpatrick, Arthur Dunne (twice), Paul Kealy
Earliest date in the year that the race has been swum - 24th Liffey Swim - 25 June 1943
Latest date in the year that the race has been swum - 101st Liffey Swim - 23 October 2021 [previous latest date - 96th Liffey Swim - 19 September 2015]
Earliest start time - 93rd Liffey Swim -18 August 2012 at 11.15 - Butt Bridge to East Link Bridge near the 3Arena
Latest start time - 65th Liffey Swim - 21 August 1984 at 20.00
Brother and Sister Winners of the Liffey Swim - David Cummins (Cormorant SC) 1975 and Ann Cummins (Cormorant SC) 1977 (her brother was the fastest swimmer in 1977)
Husband and Wife Liffey Swim Winners - Ciarán O'Driscoll (2013) - Half Moon SC and Siobhán Hoare (1988, 1991) - Half Moon SC; Donncha Ó Siadhail (2015) - Swim4Life SC and Jennifer Gilbert (2016) - Swim4Life SC
Male winners of the Liffey Swim who also placed 2nd - John Cyril Hopkins (winner 1921, runner-up 1922); Thomas Hayes Dockrell (winner 1922, runner-up 1923); Richard N. Case (winner 1934,1936,1937,1938, runner-up 1939); Jimmy Rafter (winner 1946, runner-up 1944); Patrick G. Condon (winner 1944, runner-up 1947); Michael Fitzpatrick (winner 1980, runner-up 1972,1974); Bert O'Brien (winner 1988,1995, runner-up 1967), Ciarán O'Driscoll (winner 2013, runner-up 1975), Donncha Ó Siadhail (winner 2014, runner-up 2018)
Longest gap between Liffey Swim Wins - 7 years - Bert O'Brien (1988, 1995)
Two sets of brothers finished in the top ten placings in the 62nd Liffey Swim in 1981 - The Dunne brothers, Art and Gerry, 1st and 2nd, respectively, and the O'Dea brothers, Paul and Joe, 7th and 10th, respectively
Greatest number of fastest times in Liffey Swim - 9 - Francis "Chalkey" White (1966-1971,1973,1974,1980); he missed the Liffey Swim in 1972 while representing Ireland at an international meeting in Belgium and attempting to qualify for the Olympic Games in Munich
Longest sequence of fastest swims - 6 - Francis "Chalkey" White (1966-1971)
Thomas A. "Tommy" O'Reilly, Winner of Liffey Swim in 1926, became President of the I.R.F.U. in 1963-64
Paul Kealy, the winner in 1983, was the first cousin of the double Liffey Swim winner in 1981 and 1982, Arthur 'Art' Dunne
Jason Stynes (Kingdom SC, Tralee), the winner in 1984, was the nephew of winners Colm O'Brien (1963, Half Moon SC) and Bert O'Brien (1988, 1995, Sandycove SC)
Father and son winner and fastest swimmer in same year - 2009: Pat O'Driscoll winner and Daire O'Driscoll fastest swim, nephew of Ciarán O'Driscoll, 2013 winner
Liffey Swim winners in the fastest times under handicap - 1932: Leo Maher (Republican SC); 1946: Jimmy Rafter (Half Moon SC); 1958: Robin Power (Sunday's Well SC, Cork); 1966: Francis 'Chalkey' White (Guinness SC); 1967: Francis 'Chalkey' White (Guinness SC); 2003: John Morton (Wicklow SC); 2006: Kevin Stacey (Coolmine SC)
Butch Moore (North Dublin SC), a competitor in the 1955 Liffey Swim, achieved celebrity status in 1965 as Ireland's first contestant in the Eurovision Song Contest in Naples singing Walking in Streets in the Rain; Ireland placed 6th of 18 entrants
Rachel Lee, the 2014 winner and fastest swimmer off scratch, had previously achieved the fastest Liffey swim by a woman on at least four occasions
Father and son winners of the Liffey Swim - Derek "Bimbo" Wilkes 1989 and Gerard Wilkes 2014 of North Dublin SC
Ken Turner, fastest time in 1991 and 1992, and David Turner, fastest time in 2001, are brothers
Nathan Fullam-Turner, the winner of the 2017 fastest time, is a nephew of both Ken and David Turner, and is the younger cousin of Conor Turner, son of David Turner and five times winner of the fastest time prize in 2011, 2012, 2014, 2015 and 2016 
Niall O'Sullivan, Dublin SC won the first prize for first outside the winners prizes for going under the new Rosie O'Hackett Bridge when the prize was first introduced in 2014.
Patrick Sheehan (Sheehan) (Garda SC), who finished in the Liffey Swim in 1932, is the father of John Sheahan, Irish musician and composer and the last surviving member of The Dubliners
2017: First time the male and female winners came from the same swimming club, Dublin SC - Colin Monaghan and Ann Marie Bourke
Longest gap between 1st and second place: 2 minutes 13 seconds, Ciaran O'Driscoll (2013) over a shorter than normal course.
Mark Hanley, aged 15, winner of the 100th Liffey Swim, is the youngest winner since Jason Stynes (Kingdom SC, Tralee),aged 14, won the 65th Liffey Swim in 1984
Sinead Delaney, the 2019 winner, and her mother Joan Delaney (9th scoring place) were the first two members of the Phoenix SC winning team to finish
In the 11th Liffey Swim in 1930, William F. Case (Clontarf SC), an 18-year-old, won the race using only backstroke from start to finish
In the 100th Liffey Swim in 2019, Ceall Ó Dunlaing (Dublin SC) became the first ever swimmer to complete the course using only the energy-sapping butterfly stroke
In the 101st Liffey Swim in 2021, Claire O'Dwyer (Dublin SC) who placed 2nd became the oldest female swimmer at age 79 to place in the top three finishers
In 2021 Pat O'Driscoll (Templeogue SC), the winner in 2009, received recognition for completing his 50th Liffey Swim, joining a small band of swimmers to have achieved this landmark
The 101st Liffey Swim was swum upstream for the first time in the race's history from the 3-Arena to the Customs House
Ceall Ó Dunlaing (Dublin SC) swam the 102nd Liffey Swim in 2022 using only backstroke in a time of 32:54, having previously completed the 100th Liffey Swim in 2019 using only the butterfly stroke, a unique double (see above)
The 2022 event marked the 50th Liffey Swim completed by Pat O'Driscoll and Derek Wilkes

Roll of Honour

Liffey Swim Winners - Men

1920	J.J.  "Jack" Kennedy (Sandycove SC) 28:34
1921	John Cyril Hopkins (Pembroke SC) 27:31
1922	Thomas "Hayes" Dockrell (Dublin SC) 29:12
1923	Charles "Cecil" Fagan (Sandycove SC) 29:15
1924	O'Sullivan Roche (Clontarf SC) 32:25
1925	Gerard C. "Gerry" Higginbotham (Sandycove SC) 30:25
1926	Thomas A. O'Reilly (Clontarf SC) 29:26
1927	James Philip Wallace (St Andrew's College) 28:37
1928	Philip T. Brooks (Dublin University SC) 28:17
1929	Dermot J. Healy (Sandycove SC) 29:28
1930	Willam F. "Billy" Case (Clontarf SC) 27:38
1931	E.J. Doyle (Clontarf SC) 32:45
1932	Leo Maher (Republican SC) 25:42
1933	John "Johnny" Ellis (Clontarf SC) 27:07
1934	Richard N."Ritchie" Case (Clontarf SC) 27:02
1935	Andrew Crosbie (Sunday's Well SC, Cork) 27:04
1936	Richard N."Ritchie" Case (Clontarf SC) 29:59‡
1937	Richard N."Ritchie" Case (Clontarf SC) 27:29‡
1938	Richard N."Ritchie" Case (Clontarf SC) 32:15‡
1939	William Haskins Ashmore (Dublin University SC) 51:30†
1940	Patrick Kinsella (Sandycove SC) 25:26
1941	Tom Hannigan (North Dublin SC) 29:22
1942	Christopher P. Cloake (Dublin SC) 26:35
1943	Anthony W. Kennett (Pembroke SC) 28:45
1944	Patrick G. Condon (North Dublin SC) 27:45
1945	J.P.D. "Jack" Cassidy (Clontarf SC) 26:25
1946	John "Jimmy" Rafter (Half Moon SC) 31:42
1947	Kenneth E. Ruddock (Carlow SC) 29:10
1948	David Griffin (North Dublin SC) 31:27
1949	Frank O'Donovan (North Dublin SC) 24:22
1950	Joe Grant (Shannon SC) 25:42
1951	J.J. "Jack" Fagan (North Dublin SC) 26:03
1952	Gerry Best (Half Moon SC) 25:03
1953	Gerry Boland (North Dublin SC) 26:03
1954	Jimmy Markey (Dublin SC) 24:57
1955	Patrick "Pat" Broderick (Galway SC) 26:40
1956	Thomas "Tommy" May (Colmcille SC) 25:32
1957	Cyril Hardy (Crusade Aquatic Club) 26:30
1958	Robin Power (Sunday's Well SC, Cork) 22:42
1959	Kevin King (Crusade Aquatic Club) 25:07
1960	Seán Heffernan (Clontarf SC) 23:36
1961	Anthony "Tony" Hardy (Crusade Aquatic Club) 24:12
1962	Anthony "Tony" Byrne (Dublin SC) 24:33
1963	Colm O'Brien (Half Moon SC) 24:25
1964	David Page (North Dublin SC) 23:52
1965	Patrick J. Kelly (Guinness SC) 22:10
1966	Francis "Chalkey" White (Guinness SC) 22:02
1967	Francis "Chalkey" White (Guinness SC) 21:44
1968	William H. "Liam" Lacey (Colmcille SC) 22:23
1969	John  Mulvey (Half Moon SC) 24:02
1970	David Fitzgerald (Crusade Aquatic Club) 25:01
1971	Ultan Kerrigan (North Dublin SC) 27:10
1972	Fintan O'Meara (Clontarf SC) 23:38
1973	Paul Emmett (Half Moon SC) 21:10
1974	Liam Bohane (Half Moon SC) 20:27
1975	David Cummins (Cormorant SC) 21:20
1976	Kevin Scully (Templeogue SC) 
1977	Nicholas "Nicky" O'Meara (Clontarf SC) 21:45§
1978	Jim Mooney (Half Moon SC) 17:20§
1979	Dermot Hughes (Half Moon SC) 20:24§
1980	Michael "Mick" Fitzpatrick (Half Moon SC) 25:54
1981	Arthur "Art" Dunne (Half Moon SC)24:50 ∞
1982	Arthur "Art" Dunne (Half Moon SC) 21:27 ∞
1983	Paul Kealy (Half Moon SC) 23:32
1984	Jason Stynes (Kingdom SC) 24:13
1985	Richard Joyce (North Dublin SC) 23:25
1986	Greg O'Dwyer (Guinness SC) 20:21
1987	Shane Nicoletti (Guinness SC) 23:22
1988	Bert O'Brien (Sandycove SC) 22:36
1989	Derek "Bimbo" Wilkes (North Dublin SC) 26:48
1990	Oliver Flanagan (St. Vincent's SC) 21:11
1991	Vincent Tormey (Dublin University SC) 25:29
1992	Mattie Waine (Guinness SC) 20:40
1993	John Dunne (Metro SC) 21:35
1994	Michael Finnegan (ESB SC) 22:49
1995	Bert O'Brien (Sandycove SC) 23:03
1996	Frank Chatham (North Dublin SC) 22:20
1997	Michael Mongey (St Vincent's SC) 21:05
1998	Frank Carroll (Glenalbyn SC) 22:08
1999	John Ward (Aer Lingus SC) 24:53
2000	Brian Mongey (Millennium SC) 26:16
2001	Paul Byrne (North Dublin SC) 24:31
2002	Pascal Russell (St Paul's SC) [age 59]
2003	John Morton (Wicklow SC)
2004	Robert Clarke (Eastern Bay SC)
2005	Dan Smyth (NAC Masters SC) 29:54
2006	Kevin Stacey (Coolmine SC) 27:24
2007	Larry Mooney (Guinness SC) 26:01
2008	Charles Harper (Dublin SC) 18:13
2009	Pat O'Driscoll (Templeogue SC) 26:37
2010	Brian O'Dwyer (Guinness SC) 26:40
2011	Declan Proctor (Eastern Bay SC) 39:43
2012	Tom Loftus (Eastern Bay SC) 23:39≠
2013   Ciarán O'Driscoll (Half Moon SC) 23:16≠
2014   Gerard Wilkes (North Dublin SC) 34:49¶#
2015   Donncha Ó Siadhail (Swim4Life) 31:01#
2016   Brian Murray (Eastern Bay SC) 29:46
2017   Colin Monaghan (Dublin SC) 34:42
2018   Paul O'Flynn (Half Moon SC) 34:53
2019   Mark Hanley (North Dublin SC) 35:29
2020   Not held due to Covid-19 restrictions 
2021   David Wheelahan (Sandycove SC) 25:48¥
2022   Ken Dent (Dublin SC) 35:53

‡Bull Wall to Dollymount Strand, scratch race; † Bull Wall to Clontarf Baths, handicapped race; § Liffey Swim held at Islandbridge Memorial Park finishing at the Dublin University Boat House, Islandbridge, handicapped race; ≠Butt Bridge to East Link Bridge at the 3Arena; ¶ Rory O'Moore Bridge (Watling Street) to Custom House Quay under Rosie Hackett Bridge for first time; # Race swum against an incoming tide, accounting for slower times; ∞ Died 24 January 2009, aged 42, RIP; ¥Upstream from 3Arena to Customs House, about 1600m

Liffey Swim Winners - Women

1920-1976 Not Held
1977   Ann Cummins (Cormorant SC) 6:18†
1978	Yvonne Smith (Guinness SC) 5:00‡
1979	Mairéad Doran (Dublin SC) 6:42§
1980   M Carolan (Coolmine SC) NT
1981   Louise Keogh (Dublin SC) 7:28
1982   Audrey Martin (Dundrum SC) 6:42
1983   Janne Murphy (E.S.B. SC) 10:45
1984   Maeve Chaney (Half Moon SC) 6:55
1985   Deirdre Kenny (Atlanta SC) 6:37
1986   Paula Kearns (Otter SC) 6:00
1987   Brenda Howard (Dundrum SC) 10:46#
1988   Siobhán Hoare (Half Moon) 20:51♣
1989   Ciara Byrne (Trojan SC) 17:30♣
1990   Gillian Murray (Half Moon) 24:32♣
1991	Siobhán Hoare (Half Moon SC) 27:13♥
1992	Anne Hudson (Wicklow SC) 22:35
1993   Jill Donaghey (Dublin SC) 23:04
1994	Mary McDermot (Dublin SC) 23:03
1995	Elaine Murphy (ESB SC) 22:15
1996	Caroline Fleming (Tallaght SC) 26:18
1997	Róisín Ryan (Barracuda SC) 23:00
1998	Aishling Wadden (Wicklow SC) 27:23
1999	Debbie Doyle (Millennium SC) 25:40
2000	Ciara O'Sullivan (St. Paul's SC) 24:15
2001	Valerie Spollen (Phoenix SC) 20:23
2002	Mary Rose Keegan (Otter SC)
2003	Sandra Trappe (Dublin SC)
2004	Colette Kelly (Guinness SC)
2005	Molly Molloy (Dublin SC) 30:52
2006	Claire Gavaghan (ESB SC) 23:57
2007	Sandy Dowling (Eastern Bay SC) 25:55
2008	Mary Kelly (Aer Lingus SC) 
2009	Sorcha Barry (Glenalbyn SC) 25:55
2010	Deirdre Dunne (St Vincent's SC) 26:39
2011   Maria Quintanilla (Dublin SC) 32:23
2012   Clodagh Nolan (Carraig Masters SC) 22:35≠
2013	Gina Murphy (Glenalbyn Masters SC) 28:22≠
2014   Rachel Lee (Guinness SC) 30:15¶#
2015   Orla Walsh (ESB) 30:17#
2016   Jennifer Gilbert (Swim4Life SC) 29:46
2017   Anne Marie Bourke (Dublin SC) 30:36
2018   Triona Muldoon (Clontarf SC) 30:56
2019   Sinead Delaney (Phoenix SC) 39:07
2020   Not held due to Covid-19 pandemic
2021   Tara Slevin (Glenalbyn Masters SC) 26.41∞
2022   Melissa Corbally (NAC Masters) 41:57

† 500 yards race at Islandbridge Memorial Park finishing at Dublin University Boat House; ‡ 500 metres race at Islandbridge Memorial Park finishing at Dublin University Boat House; § 600 metres race at Islandbridge Memorial Park finishing at Dublin University Boat House, Islandbridge; ≠ Butt Bridge to East Link Bridge at the 3Arena; ¶ Rory O'Moore Bridge (Watling Street) to Custom House Quay under Rosie Hackett Bridge for first time; # Race swum against an incoming tide, accounting for slower times; # 1000 yards course at Islandbridge; ♣ 1-mile course at Islandbridge; ♥ First Liffey Swim for women on classic Liffey Quays under bridges course; ∞Upstream from 3Arena to Customs House, about 1600m

Liffey Swim Winners - Teams Men
A club team competition was inaugurated in 1934 on the occasion of the 15th Liffey Swim. A scoring team comprised four swimmers, with the placings of the first four members of each team to count as points. The team with the lowest aggregate points was deemed the winner of this subsidiary competition for a special prize. A silver-mounted mahogany shield, sponsored by Independent Newspapers Ltd., was presented for the first time for the team competition in 1960 at the 41st Liffey Swim.

1920-1933 Not held
1934 Clontarf SC (1,6,7,8) 22pts
1935 Clontarf SC (3,8,11,12) 34pts
1936 Clontarf SC (1,5,6,7) 19pts‡
1937 Clontarf SC (1,3,4,7) 15pts‡
1938 Clontarf SC (1,2,6,9) 18pts‡
1939 North Dublin Winter SC (4,5,6,8) 23pts†
1940 Clontarf SC (4,5,8,14) 31pts
1941 North Dublin Winter SC (1,2,3,4) 10pts
1942 Pembroke SC (3,9,10,12) 34pts
1943 North Dublin Winter SC (3,5,6,10) 24pts
1944 North Dublin Winter SC (1,7,11,13) 32pts
1945 North Dublin Winter SC (6,12,14,18) 50pts
1946 Clontarf SC (4,5,7,18) 34pts
1947 North Dublin Winter SC (2,5,8,12) 27pts
1948 North Dublin Winter SC (1,2,7,8) 18pts
1949 North Dublin Winter SC (1,6,8,9) 24pts
1950 North Dublin Winter SC (5,6,10,11) 32pts
1951 Dublin SC (4,6,10,13) 33pts
1952 North Dublin Winter SC (2,6,7,8) 23pts
1953 North Dublin Winter SC (1,3,6,9) 19pts
1954 Dublin SC (1,3,7,9) 20pts
1955 North Dublin Winter SC (2,8,10,12) 32pts
1956 Pembroke SC (5,6,13,14) 38pts
1957 North Dublin Winter SC (2,7,11,NP)≠
1958 North Dublin Winter SC (4,9,13,16) 42pts
1959 Clontarf SC (3,4,9,13) 29pts
1960 Dublin SC (2,5,6,15) 28pts
1961 Clontarf SC (2,3,5, NP)≠
1962 Club Snámha Columcille (2,3,7,12) 24pts
1963 Half Moon SC (1,10,14,15) 40pts, tiedClub Snámha Columcille (6,7,11,16) 40pts, tied
1964 North Dublin Winter SC (1,2,8,9) 20pts
1965 Club Snámha Columcille (3,5, NP, NP)≠
1966 Club Snámha Columcille (3,8,12, NP)≠
1967 Half Moon SC (2,3,4,5) 14pts
1968 Half Moon SC (2,3,5,NP)≠
1969 Club Snámha Columcille (2,3,7,10) 22pts
1970 Guinness SC (5,6,7,??)
1971 Half Moon SC (2,6,13,15) 36pts
1972 Half Moon SC (2,3,4,8) 17pts
1973 Half Moon SC (1,2,7,16) 26pts
1974 Half Moon SC (1,2,7,9) 19pts
1975 Dublin SC (2,7,9,12) 30pts
1976 Templeogue SC (1,2,11,12) 26pts
1977 North Dublin Winter SC (2,7,10,NP)≠§  
1978 Half Moon SC (1,2,3,6) 12pts§	
1979 Half Moon SC (1,2,6,NP)≠§	
1980 Half Moon SC (1,3,7,8) 19pts
1981 Half Moon SC (1,2,7,8) 19pts
1982 Half Moon SC (1,4,5,8) 18pts
1983 Half Moon SC (1,2,5,7) 15pts
1984 Half Moon SC (4,6,8,10) 28pts
1985 Half Moon SC (2,3,4,5) 14pts
1986 Atlanta Metropolitan SC (2,3,12,18) 35pts
1987 North Dublin Winter SC (15,16,21,25) 77 pts
1988 Clontarf SC (2,10,18,22) 51pts
1989 North Dublin Winter SC (1,2,7,8) 18pts
1990 Guinness SC (3,4,5,6) 18pts
1991 Half Moon SC (4,6,11,15) 36pts
1992 Guinness SC (1,2,7,15) 25pts
1993 Metropolitan SC (1,4,9,10) 24 pts
1994 St. Vincent's SC (6,11,22,30) 69pts
1995 Glenalbyn SC (6,12,19,21) 58pts
1996 Sandycove SC (2,8,11,25) 46pts
1997 St Vincent's SC (1,2,11,19) 33pts
1998 Glenalbyn SC (1,3,16,28) 48pts
1999 Guinness SC (4,5,6,NP)≠
2000 Half Moon SC (NP,NP,NP,NP)≠
2001 Half Moon SC (2,14,NP,32)≠
2002
2003
2004
2005 St Vincent's SC (3,11,14,29) 57pts
2006 Sandycove SC (4,12,13,23) 52pts
2007 Guinness SC (1,2,9,22) 34pts
2008 Guinness SC (5,11,18,22) 56pts, tiedNAC Masters SC (7,9,12,28) 56pts, tied
2009 Sandycove SC (7,17,18,23) 65pts
2010 Eastern Bay SC (2,5,14,17) 38pts
2011 Sandycove SC (9,11,24,44) 88pts
2012 Eastern Bay (1,3,8,10) 22pts♦
2013 North Dublin Winter SC (4,10,16,21) 51pts♦
2014 NAC Masters SC (1,3,32,33) 66pts¶
2015 North Dublin SC (2,3,9,26) 34pts
2016 NAC Masters SC (8,9,11,14) 42pts
2017 Clontarf SC (4,13,15,16) 48pts
2018 Sandycove SC (4,5,9,11) 29pts
2019 Sandycove SC (2,5,8,9) 24pts
2020 Not held due to Covid-19 restrictions
2021 NAC Masters (3,8,14,18) 43pts∞
2022 NAC Masters (5,8,9,27) 49pts

‡ Bull Wall to Dollymount Strand, scratch race; † Bull Wall to Clontarf Baths, handicapped race; § Liffey Swim held at Islandbridge Memorial Park finishing at the slipway of Dublin University Boat House, Islandbridge, handicapped race; ≠ NP=Not published in newspaper reports; ♦ Butt Bridge to East Link Bridge at the 3Arena; ¶ Rory O'Moore Bridge (Watling Street) to Custom House Quay under Rosie Hackett Bridge for first time; ∞Upstream from 3Arena to Customs House, about 1600m

Liffey Swim Winners - Teams Women

1920-1976 Not held
1977 Otter SC (2,4,??)†
1978 Guinness SC (1,2,3,11) 17pts‡	
1979 Dublin SC (1,2,5, xx)	
1980 Coolmine SC (1,2,3, xx)
1981 Dublin SC (1,2,5, xx)
1982 Dublin SC (2,3,4,8) 17pts
1983 E.S.B. SC (1, xx, xx, xx)
1984 Dundrum SC (6,8,12,14) 40pts
1985 Barracuda SC (2,3,4,6) 15pts
1986 Otter SC (1,5,10,12) 28pts
1987 Wicklow SC (2,3,5,9) 19pts#
1988 Wicklow SC, tiedDundrum SC, tied♣
1989 Dundrum SC (3, xx, xx, xx)♣
1990 Dundrum SC (3,15,16, xx)♣
1991 Glenalbyn SC (2,8,10,14) 34pts♥
1992 
1993 Glenalbyn SC (4,10,12,13) 39pts
1994 Glenalbyn SC (2,3,4,11) 20pts
1995 Polar Bears SC (2,4,20,45) 71pts
1996 Polar Bears SC (11,13,14,20) 58pts
1997 Polar Bears SC (2,7,9,29) 47pts
1998 Dundrum SC (6,7,10,28) 51pts
1999 Millennium SC (1,2,5,??)
2000 Dublin SC (3,??.??,??)
2001
2002
2003
2004
2005 Dublin SC (1,13,17,18) 49pts
2006 Dublin SC (6,7,11,17) 41pts
2007 Eastern Bay SC (1,3,11,17) 32pts
2008 Dublin SC (4,7,9,19) 39pts
2009 Glenalbyn Masters SC (1,3,5,8) 17pts
2010 Eastern Bay SC (6,7,8,17) 38pts
2011 Glenalbyn Masters SC (4,6,13,14) 37pts
2012 Dublin SC (5,7,13,14) 39pts♦
2013 Glenalbyn Masters SC (1,7,8,13) 29pts♦
2014 Dublin SC (3,11,19,26) 59pts¶
2015 NAC Masters SC (7,10,15,17) 49pts
2016 Dublin SC (2,8,9,10) 29pts
2017 Dublin SC (1,9,11,12) 33pts
2018 Glenalbyn Masters (2,5,6,9) 22pts
2019 Phoenix SC (1,9,15,21) 46pts
2020 Not held due to Covid-19 pandemic
2021 Dublin SC (2,9,17,19) 47pts∞
2022 NAC Masters (1,2,4,13) 20pts

† 500 yards race at Islandbridge Memorial Park finishing at Dublin University Boat House, three to score; ‡ 500 metres race at Islandbridge Memorial Park finishing at Dublin University Boat House; § 600 metres race at Islandbridge Memorial Park finishing at Dublin University Boat House, Islandbridge; ♦ Butt Bridge to East Link Bridge at the 3Arena; ¶ Rory O'Moore Bridge (Watling Street) to Custom House Quay under Rosie Hackett Bridge for first time; # Race swum against an incoming tide, accounting for slower times; # 1000 yards course at Islandbridge; ♣ 1-mile course at Islandbridge; ♥ First Liffey Swim for women on classic Liffey Quays under bridges course; ∞Upstream from 3Arena to Customs House, about 1600m

Liffey Swim - Fastest Men

1920	C.R. Walsh (Sandycove SC) 27:25 (13th)
1921	Ernest Edmondson Benson (Dublin University SC) (4th)
1922	C.R. Walsh (Sandycove SC) 27:10 (placing not reported)
1923	Cecil Fagan (Sandycove SC) 29:15 (1st)
1924	
1925	Ian Henry Macreight Macredy (Pembroke SC) 27:00 (9th), tied;K.J. McLean§ (Pembroke SC) 27:00 (17th), tied
1926	C.P. Kenna (Sandycove SC) 27:31 (2nd)
1927	Cecil Fagan (Sandycove SC) 26:35 (7th)
1928	Philip T Brooks (Dublin University SC) 28:17 (1st)
1929	C.P. Kenna (Sandycove SC) 26:55 (3rd)
1930	J. Leo O'Brien (Sandycove SC) 25:00 (19th)
1931	
1932	Leo Maher (Republican SC) 25:42 (1st)
1933	Philip Hannigan (Republican SC) 25:32 (2nd)
1934	Richard N."Ritchie" Case (Clontarf SC) 27:02 (1st)‡
1935	Andrew Crosbie (Sunday's Well SC, Cork) 27:04 (1st)‡
1936	Richard N."Ritchie" Case (Clontarf SC) 29:59 (1st)‡
1937	Richard N."Ritchie" Case (Clontarf SC) 27:29 (1st)‡
1938	Richard N."Ritchie" Case (Clontarf SC) 32:15 (1st)‡
1939	Richard N."Ritchie" Case (Clontarf SC) 50:26 (2nd)#
1940	
1941	W.H.H. Deane (Sandycove SC) 25:25 (28th)
1942	William H. Ashmore (Dublin University SC) 23:00
1943	William P. "Bill" Hawkins (Dublin SC) 25:05 (2nd)
1944	William P. "Bill" Hawkins (Dublin SC) 24:01 (3rd)
1945	Des Corbett (Bray Cove SC) 23:25 (15th)
1946	Jimmy Rafter (Half Moon SC) 31:42 (1st)
1947	Patrick G. Condon (North Dublin WSC) 26:43 (2nd)
1948	William P. "Bill" Hawkins (Dublin SC) 27:45 (10th)
1949	John Caldwell "Jack" Wardrop (Motherwell ASC, Scotland) 19:02 (2nd)
1950	J.P.D. "Jack" Cassidy (Clontarf SC) 24:40 (16th)
1951	Eric W. Briggs (Pembroke SC) 24:35 (5th)
1952	Eric W. Briggs (Pembroke SC) 23:07
1953	Cecil Young (Wellington SC, Belfast) 22:00 (20th)
1954	Paddy Arrigan (Curragh) 22:00 (2nd)
1955	Freddy Parkes (Wellington SC, Belfast) 24:36 (3rd)
1956	Freddy Parkes (Wellington SC, Belfast) 24:05 (11th)
1957	Gerard F. Callanan (Pembroke SC) 25:01 (5th)
1958	Robin Power (Sunday's Well, Cork) 25:27 (1st), tied Gerard F. Callanan (Pembroke SC) 25:27, tied
1959	Robin Power (Sunday's Well, Cork) 22:52 (2nd)
1960	Rory O'Connor (Club Snámha Columcille) 22:27 
1961	Owen Corrigan (Club Snámha Columcille) 22:35 (6th)
1962	Nicholas Smith (Dublin SC) 21:29 (4th)
1963	Donnacha O'Dea (Club Snámha Columcille) 20:35 (16th)
1964	Owen Corrigan (Club Snámha Columcille) 21:49 (6th)
1965	Donnacha O'Dea (Club Snámha Columcille) 20:00
1966	Francis "Chalkey" White (Guinness SC) 22:02 (1st)
1967	Francis "Chalkey" White (Guinness SC) 21:44 (1st)
1968	Francis "Chalkey" White (Guinness SC) 19:52 (11th)
1969	Francis "Chalkey" White (Guinness SC) 21:31 (9th)
1970	Francis "Chalkey" White (Guinness SC) 20:20 (5th)
1971	Francis "Chalkey" White (Guinness SC) 19:25 (14th)
1972	Liam Bohane (Half Moon SC) 20:00 (3rd)
1973	Francis "Chalkey" White (Guinness SC & Villanova) 18:02
1974	Francis "Chalkey" White (Guinness SC) 19:24 (13th)
1975	Lorcan Shelley (Terenure SC) 21:18 (4th)
1976	David Cummins (Cormorant SC) 21:32 
1977	David Cummins (Cormorant SC) 16:32†
1978	David Cummins (Cormorant SC) 13:20†
1979	                                  †
1980	Francis "Chalkey" White (Guinness SC) 18:44 (13th)
1981	W. Kehoe (Sandycove SC) 22:26 
1982	Aidan Towey (Terenure SC) 18:22
1983	Tadgh Murphy (Half Moon SC) 19:02
1984	Tadgh Murphy (Half Moon SC) 22:00
1985	Jason Stynes (Kingdom SC, Kerry) 19:10
1986	Aidan Towey (Terenure SC) 16:32
1987	Shane Moraghan (Glenalbyn) 20:20 (3rd)
1988	Shane Moraghan (Glenalbyn) 17:06
1989	Mark Water (Triton SC) 21:40 (21st)
1990	Shane Moraghan (Glenalbyn) 18:26
1991	Ken Turner (Glenalbyn SC) 20:25 (3rd)
1992	Ken Turner (CRC SC) 18:27
1993	Stephen Saunders (Terenure College SC) 18:29
1994	Stephen Saunders (Terenure College SC) 17:48
1995	Stephen Saunders (Trojan SC) 21:21
1996	Stephen Saunders (Trojan SC) 20:50
1997	Stephen Saunders (Trojan SC) 17:10
1998	Eoin Fahy (Half Moon SC) 21:45 (6th)
1999	D. Farrell (Sandycove SC) 21:47
2000	Kevin Williamson (Terenure College SC) 23:29 [age 41]
2001	David Turner (St. Vincent's)
2002	Eoin Fahy (Guinness SC) 
2003	John Morton (Wicklow SC) (1st)
2004	
2005	Kevin Stacey (Coolmine SC) 24:06 (45th)
2006   Kevin Stacey (Coolmine SC) 27:24 (1st)
2007	Shane Drumm (ESB SC) 20:16 (5th)
2008	Adam Carroll (ESB SC) 16:28 (41st)
2009	Daire O'Driscoll (Templeogue SC) 22:42 (14th)
2010	Séamus Stacey (NUI Maynooth SC) 19:29 (12th)
2011	Conor Turner (Aer Lingus SC) 28:20 (35th)
2012	Conor Turner (Aer Lingus SC) 16:07 (139th)♦
2013   Donncha Ó Siadhail (NUI Maynooth SC) 21:02 (55th)♦
2014   Conor Turner (Aer Lingus SC) 29:43 (2nd)¶
2015   Conor Turner (North Dublin SC) 29:57 (3rd)
2016   Conor Turner (North Dublin SC) 24:06 (152nd)
2017   Nathan Turner (Aer Lingus SC) 26:01 (90th)
2018   Donncha Ó Siadhail (Meath Masters) 28:17 (2nd)
2019   Donncha Ó Siadhail (Meath Masters) 31:34 (42nd)
2020   Not held due to Covid-19 pandemic
2021   Donncha Ó Siadhail (Meath Masters) 19:00 (180th)∞
2022   David McPhillips (Glenalbyn Masters) 25:26 (232nd)°

§ He appeared as "J. Pembroke" in the results; ‡ Scratch races; # Handicapped race from Bull Wall to Clontarf Baths; † Race swum at Islandbridge Memorial Park finishing at Dublin University Boat House, Islandbridge; ♦ Butt Bridge to East Link Bridge at the 3Arena; ¶ Rory O'Moore Bridge (Watling Street) to Custom House Quay under Rosie Hackett Bridge for first time; ∞Upstream from 3Arena to Customs House, about 1600m °https://my1.raceresult.com/220232/RRPublish/data/pdf?name=Result%20Lists%7CFull%20Results&contest=2&lang=en

Liffey Swim - Fastest Women

1920-1976 Not held
1977  Caroline Green (King's Hospital SC) 6:13†
1978  Ann Cummins (Cormorant SC) 4:19, tied‡Caroline Green (King's Hospital) 4:19, tied‡
1979 §
1980  Ann Cummins (Cormorant SC) 5:05
1981  Mairéad Doran (Dublin SC) 7:19
1982  Louise Keogh (Dublin SC) NT
1983  Janne Murphy (E.S.B. SC) 10:45
1984  Louise Keogh (Dublin SC) 6:14
1985  Siobhán Hoare (King's Hospital SC) 3:39
1986  Mandi Kavanagh (Otter SC) 5:50
1987  Siobhán Hoare (King's Hospital SC) 10:21#
1988  Brenda Howard (Dundrum SC) 19:23♣
1989  Ciara Byrne (Trojan SC) 17:30♣
1990  Ciara Byrne (Trojan SC) 19:23♣
1991  Linda Clarke (Glenalbyn SC) 25:11♥
1992  L. Campbell (King's Hospital SC) 19:22
1993 
1994  Dawn McGlynn (Portmarnock SC) 18:43
1995 
1996  Heidi Kinsella (Glenalbyn SC) 24:08
1997  Edel Mulholland (Glenalbyn SC) 20:11
1998  Rachel Lee (Eastern Bay SC) 23:09
1999 
2000  Rachel Lee (Guinness SC) 20:33
2001  Yvonne Emerson (Cormorant SC)
2002
2003
2004
2005  Rachel Lee (Guinness SC) 23:00 (10th)
2006  Suzanna Murphy (Trojan SC) 23:28 (8th)
2007  Gillian Gavaghan (ESB SC) 21:26 (36th)
2008  Julie Ann Galloway (NAC Masters) 14:50 (77th)
2009  Rachel Lee (Guinness SC) 24:13 (15th)
2010  Suzanne Murphy (Glenalbyn Masters SC) 20:39 (102nd)
2011  Sinead Tyrrell (Garda SC) 26:58 (3rd)
2012  Sinead Tyrrell (Garda SC) 17:16 (94th)♦
2013  Danika Sugrue (Aer Lingus SC) 21:49 (73rd)♦
2014  Rachel Lee (Guinness SC) 30:15(1st)¶
2015  Ciara Doran (Limerick SC) 28:38 (3rd)
2016  Ciara Doran (City of Derry SC) 23:01 (145th)
2017  Ciara Doran (City of Derry SC) 22:37 (117th)
2018  Ciara Doran (Dublin SC) 27:09 (3rd)
2019  Courtney McDermott (Glenalbyn Masters) 28:47 (19th)
2020  Not held due to Covid-19 restrictions
2021  Hazel Bentley (Wicklow SC) 19:20∞ (80th)
2022  Charlotte Reid (Aer Lingus SC) 28:22 (78th)

† 500 yards race at Islandbridge Memorial Park finishing at Dublin University Boat House; ‡ 500 metres race at Islandbridge Memorial Park finishing at Dublin University Boat House; § 600 metres race at Islandbridge Memorial Park finishing at Dublin University Boat House, Islandbridge; ♦ Butt Bridge to East Link Bridge at the 3Arena; ¶ Rory O'Moore Bridge (Watling Street) to Custom House Quay under Rosie Hackett Bridge for first time; #1000 yards course at Islandbridge Memorial Park; ♣one mile course at Islandbridge Memorial Park; ♥First Liffey Swim for women on the classic Liffey Quays under the bridges course; ∞Upstream from 3Arena to Customs House, about 1600m

References

External links
Liffey Swim 1921
Liffey Swim 2000
Liffey Swim 2001
Liffey Swim 2005
Liffey Swim 2012

Swimming in the Republic of Ireland
Water sports in County Dublin
Open water swimming competitions